Sachin Khurana is an Indian model turned actor. He won the title of Grasim Mr. India in 1996 and represented India at the 1998 Mister World pageant at Turkey. He also represented India  in Best Model of the World contest in 1996. As a model he has ramp presence in over 500 fashion shows in India and abroad. He also appeared in more than 200 advertisements. He was working as theater actor and in 2002 he started acting in the television industry.

Television

Filmography

References

External links
 
 

Living people
Indian male film actors
Indian male television actors
Year of birth missing (living people)